Manuele Tarozzi (born 20 June 1998) is an Italian racing cyclist, who currently rides for UCI ProTeam .

Major results
2019
 1st 
 1st Piccolo Giro dell'Emilia
 1st Stage 9 
 10th Giro del Medio Brenta
2021
 1st 
2023
 1st  Mountains classification, Vuelta a San Juan
 1st Stage 7 Tour du Rwanda

References

External links
 

1998 births
Living people
Italian male cyclists
People from Faenza
Cyclists from Emilia-Romagna